Silas Stone is a character appearing in the comics that are published by DC Comics. He is the father of Cyborg and the creator of Titans Tower. Silas Stone first appeared in DC Comics Presents #26 and was created by Marv Wolfman and George Pérez.

Silas Stone has been featured in several adaptations, first appearing in animated form in several cartoons. Actor Joe Morton portrayed the character in the DC Extended Universe films Batman v Superman: Dawn of Justice, the theatrical cut of Justice League and Zack Snyder's Justice League (original director's cut of the 2017 film). Phil Morris portrays the character in the Doom Patrol television series on DC Universe and HBO Max.

Fictional character biography
Silas Stone is a scientist who formerly worked at S.T.A.R. Labs and is the father of Victor Stone. Blaming himself for the accident that damaged 90% of his son's body during his high school days, Silas Stone had to turn his son into a cyborg which led to Victor Stone taking the name Cyborg. As Victor blamed his father for the accident, Silas attempted to heal his son's hatred of him by helping to build Titans Tower for the Teen Titans.

While on his deathbed after years of failing to make it up to his son due to him dying from radiation poisoning caused by a monster the Teen Titans were fighting, Silas finally reconciled with Cyborg as he passes away.

In 2011, "The New 52" rebooted the DC universe. Silas Stone is a scientist at S.T.A.R. Labs Super-Human Study building in Detroit studying a mysterious box when he is informed of the arrival of his son Victor. While Silas was annoyed that Victor showed up at his place of work, Victor talks to him about the scholarships that he received. Silas states that he doesn't need a scholarship as he is already paying for his school which leads to the two of them arguing about it. When the box in the Justice League's possession and the box at S.T.A.R. Labs activate, Parademons come out and Victor is torn apart. Silas cradles his son's damaged body and vows not to lose him like he lost his wife. With help from some co-workers, Silas takes his son to a secured room while telling him to hang in there. Following Victor's brief cardiac arrest while his body is being outfitted with experimental technology, Silas starts hearing Cyborg quote the binary code indicating that his repaired body is now online. When Victor comes out of the room in his Cyborg body, he defends his father from the invading Parademons.

During the Forever Evil storyline, Batman and Catwoman arrive at S.T.A.R. Labs' Detroit Branch carrying Cyborg's body. Upon bring it to Silas Stone and T.O. Morrow, they inform him that his cybernetic support system was ripped off him by Grid when the Crime Syndicate of America arrived. After explaining how he and Catwoman evaded being trapped inside Firestorm where the rest of the Justice League and the Justice League of America became trapped, Batman tells Silas to save Victor.

In other media

Television
 Silas Stone appears in Young Justice, voiced by Khary Payton.
 Silas Stone appears in Doom Patrol, portrayed by Phil Morris. This version was convinced by the Chief to save his son Victor over his wife.
 It is implied that Silas Stone appears during a television interview scene in "No Consequences Day" (the 10th Episode of Season 1 of the show Powerless) portrayed by Phil Morris, who also plays Silas on Doom Patrol. While it is never confirmed, this connection may play into his role on Doom Patrol since it well predates his recurring role.

Film
 Silas Stone appears in the  DC Animated Movie Universe films Justice League: War and The Death of Superman, voiced by Rocky Carroll.
 An alternate reality version of Silas Stone appears in Justice League: Gods and Monsters, voiced by Carl Lumbly. This version is a member of Lex Luthor's Project Fair Play, a weapons contingency program meant to counter their universe's Justice League if necessary. Silas is enlisted by Superman to unlock data from the latter's spaceship. However, Silas and his son Victor are attacked and killed by a Metal Man designed to frame Superman.
 Silas Stone appears in Batman Unlimited: Monster Mayhem, voiced by Cedric Yarbrough.
 Silas Stone appears in the films set in the DC Extended Universe portrayed by Joe Morton:
 Silas first appears in Batman v Superman: Dawn of Justice, in which he experiments on and converts his son Victor Stone into Cyborg using a Mother Box.
 Silas also appears in Justice League, in which he and other scientists are captured by Steppenwolf due to their connection to a Mother Box. After being rescued by the Justice League, Silas bonds with Victor while making improvements to the latter's body. In the director's cut, Zack Snyder's Justice League, Silas is killed while remotely activating a Mother Box.

References

External links
 Silas Stone at DC Comics Wiki
 Silas Stone at Comic Vine

DC Comics male characters
DC Comics scientists
Characters created by Marv Wolfman
Characters created by George Pérez
Fictional African-American people
Fictional inventors
Comics characters introduced in 1980